Sociedad Deportiva Compostela "B" is a Spanish football team based in Santiago de Compostela, in the autonomous community of Galicia. It is the reserve team of SD Compostela.

History
Vista Alegre Sociedad Deportiva was founded in 1948, and first reached Tercera División in 1980. In 1997, the club was incorporated into SD Compostela's structure, being renamed into Sociedad Deportiva Compostela B and becoming their reserve team.

Compostela B ceased activities in 2004, with the main club being under severe financial crisis. In 2007, SD Campus Stellae (a club founded in 2004 to honour Compostela's history) was "renamed" into SD Compostela; despite the first team was moved to Preferente Autonómica de Galicia (fifth tier), Campus Stellae still existed in the Terceira Autonómica de Galicia for two seasons, being the reserve side of Compostela before ceasing activities in 2009.

In 2017, Compostela signed an agreement with Zona Vella Club de Fútbol (founded in 2006) to become their reserve team; in 2019, Zona Vella was renamed into SD Compostela B.

In 2021, after Sigüeiro FC became the reserve team of Compostela, Compostela B became the second reserve team.

Season to season

Vista Alegre

11 seasons in Tercera División

Compostela B (1997–2004)

7 seasons in Tercera División

Campus Stellae

Zona Vella

Compostela B

References

External links
Official website 

B
Spanish reserve football teams
Football clubs in Galicia (Spain)
Association football clubs established in 1948
1948 establishments in Spain
Sport in Santiago de Compostela
2006 establishments in Spain
Association football clubs established in 2006